Costa Rica–Turkey relations are foreign relations between Costa Rica and Turkey. Costa Rica has an embassy in Ankara. Turkey has an embassy in San José.

High level Visits

Economic Relations
Trade volume between the two countries was 100 million USD in 2019 (Turkish exports/imports: 58.9/41.8 million USD).

See also 

 Foreign relations of Costa Rica
 Foreign relations of Turkey

References 

 
Turkey
Bilateral relations of Turkey